Herman Brearley (died 1940) was an English cathedral organist, who served in Blackburn Cathedral.

Background
Herman Brearley was born in Batley, Yorkshire. In 1905 he and his wife lived in Hastings.

He was a chorister and then assistant organist at Lichfield Cathedral.

He was appointed Conductor of the Preston Choral Society in 1918, and conductor of the Blackburn Philharmonic Choral Society in 1922. He was also the Conductor of the Meistersingers Society, the Northrop Male Voice Choir and the Grammar School Society.

He was also Blackburn Borough organist, the first holder of the post, 1922 - 1930. His family moved to Blackburn in 1924.

He was also Music Master at Queen Elizabeth's Grammar School, Blackburn.

In 1935 he became teacher of singing, sight-singing and musical dictation at the Royal Manchester College of Music.

In 1937 he succeeded Harold Dawber as Chorus Master of the Hallé Choir.

Private life
He married Mabel Daisy Root (1880–1962) who was a pianist and piano teacher. They had three children including Molly Brearley who led Froebel Educational Institute from 1955 to 1970.

Career
Assistant Organist of :
Lichfield Cathedral ???? - 1895

Organist of:
Halstead Parish Church, Essex, 1895–1901
Holy Trinity, Hastings 1901 - ????
All Saints, Hastings ???? - 1916
Blackburn Cathedral 1916 - 1939

References

English classical organists
British male organists
Cathedral organists
People from Batley
19th-century births
1940 deaths
Male classical organists